Syneilesis palmata, the palmate umbrella plant or shredded umbrella plant, is a species of flowering plant in the family Asteraceae, native to Korea and Japan. Aspreading rhizomatous perennial, at maturity its foliage typically reaches , and its inflorescences extend to about twice that height. Recommended for specimen and mass plantings in shade gardens, it is hardy in USDA zones 5 through 8. It flowers in late summer.

References

Senecioneae
Garden plants of Asia
Flora of Korea
Flora of Japan
Plants described in 1874